The 2019 Continental Cup was a Twenty20 International (T20I) cricket tournament held in Romania between 29 August and 1 September 2019. The hosts were the defending champions, having won the previous edition in 2018.

The format was originally to be two groups of three teams played over the first two days, followed by a series of play-off matches. However, after Russia withdrew two days before the tournament, the format was changed to a single round-robin stage followed by a final. The participating teams were hosts Romania, along with Austria, Czech Republic, Luxembourg and Turkey. All five teams played their first matches with T20I status during this tournament, following the decision of the ICC to grant full Twenty20 International status to all its members from 1 January 2019. Austria topped the round-robin stage and went on to defeat the Czech Republic in the final.

A number of T20I records were set during the tournament, particularly in games against Turkey who had been affected by visa problems resulting in many of their best players not being able to travel to Romania. These included Czech Republic's winning margin of 257 runs, in a game that also saw Sudesh Wickramasekara equal the fastest century in T20I cricket.

Squads

Round-robin

Points table

Fixtures

Final

References

External links
 Series home at ESPN Cricinfo

Associate international cricket competitions in 2019
Continental Cup (cricket)
Continental Cup (cricket)